United States gubernatorial elections were held on November 7, 1905, in four states. Virginia holds its gubernatorial elections in odd numbered years, every 4 years, following the United States presidential election year. Massachusetts and Rhode Island at this time held gubernatorial elections every year, which they would abandon in 1920 and 1912, respectively.

In Ohio, following a 1905 amendment to the constitution moving the election schedule, the governor's term was lengthened to three years. Elections would be held in even-numbered years from the 1908 elections.

Results

References

Notes

 
November 1905 events